Albert Vladimirovich Rybak (born 16 May 1973) is a Belarusian football manager and former player.

Career
In 1991, at the age of 17, Rybak was playing in the Soviet third division with Neman Grodno. For 2004, he signed for Slavia Mozyr after spending the previous 15 years with Neman Grodno. During his time there, Rybak sustained a ruptured ligament which caused him to retire.

Despite joining FK Riteriai in Lithuania as a goalkeeper coach, he was appointed interim head coach on three occasions, in 2016, 2018, and 2019, helping the club reach third place two seasons in a row and earning the November 2019 Coach of the Month award.

Honours
Neman Grodno
Belarusian Cup winner: 1992–93

References

External links
 Albert Rybak at FootballFacts.ru

1973 births
Living people
Association football goalkeepers
Belarusian footballers
FC Neman Grodno players
FC Slavia Mozyr players
Belarusian football managers
Belarusian expatriate football managers
Expatriate football managers in Lithuania
FC Smolevichi managers
FK Riteriai managers
FC Belshina Bobruisk managers